Mezinovsky is a rural locality (a settlement) and the administrative center of Posyolok Mezinovsky, Gus-Khrustalny District, Vladimir Oblast, Russia. The population was 2,063 as of 2010. There are 32 streets.

Geography 
Mezinovsky is located 28 km southwest of Gus-Khrustalny (the district's administrative centre) by road. Torfoprodukt is the nearest rural locality.

References 

Rural localities in Gus-Khrustalny District